The 1935 Arizona State Bulldogs football team was an American football team that represented Arizona State Teachers College (later renamed Arizona State University) in the Border Conference during the 1935 college football season. In their third season under head coach Rudy Lavik, the Bulldogs compiled a 2–5–1 record (2–2–1 against Border opponents) and were outscored by their opponents by a combined total of 66 to 29. The team captain was left tackle Dan Pace.  The Bulldogs finished 1-2-1 at home and 1-3 on the road.  All home games were played at Irish Field in Tempe, Arizona.

Schedule

Game summaries
In the rivalry matchup, Arizona State Teacher's College suffered a 26-0 road shutout against Arizona.  During their home opener in Tempe, the Bulldogs dropped a 7-3 contest to Loyola.  ASTC fell 7-6 in a road matchup against New Mexico State.  The Bulldogs bounced back with a 6-0 shutout road victory at Arizona State Teachers College at Flagstaff (ASTCF, later renamed Northern Arizona University).  Arizona State was shutout, 13-0, against New Mexico on the road.  The Bulldogs rebounded with a 14-0 home shutout win over Texas-El Paso at Irish Field.  In the rematch at Tempe, ASTC ended in a 0-0 tie with ASTCF.  The Bulldogs closed the season with a 13-0 home shutout loss to BYU.  It marked the first ever meeting between the teams in school history.

Roster
The usual Arizona State lineup included left end Clare Van Hoorebeke, left tackle Don Pace, left guard Al Dalmolin, center Bob Buntz, right guard Howard Wynn, right tackle Al Northern, right end John Rouse, quarterback Ted Miller, halfbacks Bill Parry and Bill Kajikawa, and fullback Everett Jenkens.

William Ball, Francis Clevenger, & Bennet Davis were also on the roster.

Awards and honors
Left guard Al Dalmolin earned All-Border Conference honors for the 1935 football season.

References

Arizona State
Arizona State Sun Devils football seasons
Arizona State Sun Devils football